Auditorio Fausto Gutierrez Moreno also known as Auditorio de Tijuana is an indoor arena in Tijuana, Mexico.  It is primarily used for basketball and is the home field of the Tijuana Dragons and Galgos de Tijuana.  It holds 4,500 people and was built in 1969.

Sources 
http://sic.conaculta.gob.mx/ficha.php?table=auditorio&table_id=743&estado_id=2&municipio_id=4&l=en

Fausto Gutierrez Moreno
Volleyball venues in Mexico
Basketball venues in Mexico
Sports venues in Tijuana